Rhipha gagarini is a moth in the family Erebidae. It was described by Travassos in 1955. It is found in Brazil.

References

Moths described in 1955
Phaegopterina